Rachel Baes (1 August 1912 – 8 June 1983) was a Belgian surrealist painter. The growth of the women's movement in the late 20th century led to renewed interest in women artists and brought greater appreciation of her work.  In 2002 the Koninklijk Museum in Antwerp featured Baes and Jane Graverol in an exhibition: voor Schone Kunsten.

Early life and education
Born in 1912 in Brussels to the landscape painter and portraitist Émile Baes and his wife, Rachel Baes was encouraged in her artistic efforts from an early age, although she never studied art formally.

Career
In 1929, at age 17, Baes achieved her first recognition as an artist when she exhibited works at the Salon des Indépendants in Paris.  There she was one of the members of the Surrealist group around René Magritte.  She came to know André Breton, Jean Cocteau, Max Ernst, Georges Bataille, Irène Hamoir, and Paul Éluard.

Between 1936 and 1940, Baes had an affair with Joris Van Severen, leader of the extreme rightist Verdinaso party in Belgium. In 1940 Van Severen was summarily executed by French troops without trial, the incident clouded his reputation.

Baes published a biography of Van Severen—Joris Van Severen, une âme—in 1965.

After 1961, Baes retired from public life and lived alone in Bruges. She was buried at Abbeville, alongside Van Severen.

References

 Rachel Baes, Empreintes, l'Imprimerie des Sciences, Bruxelles, 1951
 R. Baes,  Joris Van Severen, Une Âme, Zulte: Editions Oranje, 1965
 Patrick Spriet, Een Tragische Minnares (Rachel Baes, Joris Van Severen, Paul Léautaud en de surrealisten, Vanhalewijck, 2002
 M. Janssens, P.  Spriet, S. van Loo, J.  Chénieux-Gendron en X. Canonne, Gekooid verlangen (Jane Graverol, Rachel Baes en het surrealisme ...), Antwerpen: Gynaika/KMSKA, 2002
 Dupont, Pierre-Paul, "BAES Rachel (1912–1983)", in E. Gubin, C. Jacques, V. Piette & J. Puissant (eds), Dictionnaire des femmes belges: XIXe et XXe siècles. Bruxelles: Éditions Racine, 2006. 
 Xavier Canonne, Het Surrealisme in België, 1924-2000 ("Rachel Baes": 268–271), Brussel: Mercatorfonds, 2006

1912 births
1983 deaths
20th-century Belgian women artists
20th-century Belgian painters
Belgian surrealist artists
Belgian women painters
People from Ixelles
Women surrealist artists